Joe Torbay (August 13, 1941 - October 10, 2009) was a Canadian puppeteer and television personality. He was best known for puppeteering the characters of Gronk, Harvey Wallbanger, and Grammar Slammer Bammer in the television series The Hilarious House of Frightenstein.

Torbay also was regularly on CKWR-FM radio in Waterloo, Ontario, Canada.

External links
 Hilarious House of Frightenstein website biography
 
 Obituary

Canadian puppeteers
Canadian radio personalities
Canadian television personalities
University of Toronto alumni
Place of birth missing
1941 births
2009 deaths